Goubinia is a very small genus of sea snails, marine gastropod mollusks in the family Eulimidae.

Species

Goubinia insueta  (Dautzenberg, 1923) is the only species known to exist within this genus of gastropods.

References

External links
 To World Register of Marine Species

Eulimidae